The women's team competition at the 2012 European Judo Championships was held on 29 April at the Traktor Ice Arena in Chelyabinsk, Russia.

Results

Repechage

References

External links
 

Wteam
EU 2012
European Women's Team Judo Championships
Euro